Uladzimir Ivanavich Zhuravel (9 June 1971 – 18 November 2018) was a Belarusian professional football player and coach. In 2018 he was the head coach of Shakhter Karagandy. He made his professional debut in the Soviet Top League in 1990 for FC Dinamo Minsk.

Honours
Dinamo Minsk 
Belarusian Premier League champion: 1992, 1992–93, 1993–94, 1994–95, 1995, 1997
Belarusian Cup winner: 1992, 1993–94

Death
Zhuravel died on 19 November 2018 after a struggle with an illness.

References

External links 
 Uladzimir Zhuravel Profile at the footballtop.ru 

1971 births
2018 deaths
Soviet footballers
Belarusian footballers
Association football midfielders
Belarus international footballers
Belarusian expatriate footballers
Belarusian expatriate sportspeople in Israel
Expatriate footballers in Israel
Expatriate footballers in Russia
Russian Premier League players
FC Dinamo Minsk players
Hapoel Jerusalem F.C. players
FC Zhemchuzhina Sochi players
FC Kristall Smolensk players
FC Darida Minsk Raion players
FC Torpedo-BelAZ Zhodino players
Belarusian football managers
Belarusian expatriate football managers
Expatriate football managers in Kazakhstan
FC Torpedo Zhodino managers
FC Shakhtyor Soligorsk managers
FC Dinamo Minsk managers
FC Gomel managers
FC Dynamo Brest managers
FC Shakhter Karagandy managers